Thomas 'Peter' Morgan (2 September 1927 – 27 July 2009) was a British international sports shooter.

Sports shooting career
He competed in the 50 metre rifle, prone event at the 1964 Summer Olympics. He represented England in the 50 metres rifle prone event, at the 1966 British Empire and Commonwealth Games in Kingston, Jamaica.

References

1927 births
2009 deaths
British male sport shooters
Olympic shooters of Great Britain
Shooters at the 1964 Summer Olympics
Place of birth missing
Shooters at the 1966 British Empire and Commonwealth Games
Commonwealth Games competitors for England